Kadaladi block is a revenue block in the Ramanathapuram district of Tamil Nadu, India. It has a total of 60 panchayat villages.

References 
 

Revenue blocks of Ramanathapuram district